Oceanapia is a genus of sponges belonging to the family Phloeodictyidae.

The genus has almost cosmopolitan distribution.

Species

Species:

Oceanapia aberrans 
Oceanapia abrolhosensis 
Oceanapia aerea

References

Sponges